This is a list of the schools and universities in Mexico that have college football teams. College football in Mexico is overseen by the National Student Organization of American Football.

Current programs

Jacinto Licea Conference

National Conference

Defunct programs

Notes

References

See also

List of NCAA Division I FBS football programs
List of NCAA Division I FCS football programs
List of NCAA Division II football programs
List of NCAA Division III football programs
List of NAIA football programs
List of community college football programs
List of NCAA Institutions with club football teams
List of defunct college football teams
List of Japanese collegiate American football programs

Mexico
American football in Mexico